The 2009–10 Sta. Lucia Realtors season was the 17th and final season of the franchise in the Philippine Basketball Association (PBA).

Key dates
August 2: The 2009 PBA Draft took place in Fort Bonifacio, Taguig.

Draft picks

Roster

Depth chart

Philippine Cup

Eliminations

Standings

Game log

Eliminations

|- bgcolor="#bbffbb"
| 1
| October 16
| Coca Cola
| 95–76
| Reyes (21)
| Espinas (11)
| Yeo (10)
| Araneta Coliseum
| 1–0
|- bgcolor="#bbffbb" 
| 2
| October 21
| Rain or Shine
| 95–90
| Williams (28)
| Espinas (15)
| Williams (6)
| Cuneta Astrodome
| 2–0
|- bgcolor="#edbebf" 
| 3
| October 25
| Talk 'N Text
| 83–100
| Yeo, Omolon (17)
| Williams (16)
| Yeo (4)
| Araneta Coliseum
| 2–1
|- bgcolor="#bbffbb" 
| 4
| October 30
| Burger King
| 101–93
| Urbiztondo (24)
| Williams (14)
| Reyes, Yeo (6)
| Araneta Coliseum
| 3–1

|- bgcolor="#edbebf" 
| 5
| November 4
| Alaska
| 83–91
| Williams (20)
| Williams (14)
| Yeo (4)
| Araneta Coliseum
| 3–2
|- bgcolor="#edbebf" 
| 6
| November 7
| San Miguel
| 69–88
| Espinas (17)
| Williams (14)
| Reyes (6)
| Victoria City, Negros Occidental
| 3–3
|- bgcolor="#bbffbb" 
| 7
| November 13
| Smart Gilas
| 96–95
| 
| 
| 
| Ynares Center
| 
|- bgcolor="#bbffbb"
| 8
| November 18
| Barangay Ginebra
| 93–72
| Williams (26)
| Williams (14)
| Williams (7)
| Araneta Coliseum
| 4–3
|- bgcolor="#bbffbb"
| 9
| November 22
| Barako Bull
| 80–77
| Yeo (16)
| Espinas, Williams (10)
| Williams (4)
| Araneta Coliseum
| 5–3
|- bgcolor="#edbebf" 
| 10
| November 28
| Purefoods
| 63–68
| Williams (16)
| Williams (16)
| Williams, Reyes (5)
| Surigao del Norte
| 5–4

|- bgcolor="#edbebf" 
| 11
| December 4
| San Miguel
| 94–110
| Omolon (20)
| Williams (15)
| Reyes (6)
| Araneta Coliseum
| 5–5
|- bgcolor="#bbffbb" 
| 12
| December 11
| Coca Cola
| 98–92
| Williams (23)
| Williams (17)
| Reyes (7)
| Ynares Center
| 6–5
|- bgcolor="#bbffbb"
| 13
| December 16
| Barangay Ginebra
| 93–88
| Urbiztondo (22)
| Williams (19)
| Reyes (7)
| Araneta Coliseum
| 7–5
|- bgcolor="#edbebf" 
| 14
| December 23
| Talk 'N Text
| 112–117
| Reyes (32)
| Reyes (12)
| Yeo (8)
| Cuneta Astrodome
| 7–6

|- bgcolor="#bbffbb"
| 15
| January 6
| Rain or Shine
| 95–91
| Williams (25)
| Williams (19)
| Reyes (6)
| Araneta Coliseum
| 8–6
|- bgcolor="#bbffbb" 
| 16
| January 8
| Burger King
| 83–79
| Yeo (31)
| Williams (17)
| Espinas (4)
| Cuneta Astrodome
| 9–6
|- bgcolor="#edbebf" 
| 17
| January 13
| Alaska
| 77–85
| Reyes, 2 others (14)
| Williams (14)
| Urbiztondo (8)
| Araneta Coliseum
| 9–7
|- bgcolor="#bbffbb" 
| 18
| January 17
| Barako Bull
| 108–86
| Williams (25)
| Williams (11)
| Reyes (10)
| Araneta Coliseum
| 10–7
|- bgcolor="#edbebf" 
| 19
| January 22
| Purefoods
| 78–88
| Yeo (17)
| Williams (16)
| Yeo (5)
| Ynares Center
| 10–8

Playoffs

|-  bgcolor="#edbebf" 
| 1
|  January 24
|  Rain or Shine
|  86–90
|  Williams (27)
|  Williams (18)
|  Reyes (8)
|  Ynares Center
|  0–1

Fiesta Conference

Eliminations

Standings

Game log

Transactions

Pre-season

Mid-season break

Fiesta Conference

Imports recruited

References

Sta. Lucia Realtors seasons
Sta Lucia